The Trunk is a low budget, black and white 1961 British mystery film directed by Donovan Winter and starring Phil Carey, Julia Arnall and  Dermot Walsh.

Plot
Trouble ensues when Lisa marries Henry, a British lawyer. Lisa's jealous ex-boyfriend Stephen decides to take revenge by convincing her that she has killed Diane, her husband's ex-girlfriend. Lisa gives Stephen the money he wants to keep quiet and dispose of the corpse. Unfortunately, the dead woman's other ex-lover, Nicholas, sees the two together. After getting his money from Lisa, Stephen puts Diane's body in a trunk and drives to an isolated area. There he discovers that the woman is not feigning death; she has been killed by the jealous Nicholas, in a manner that will incriminate Stephen.

Cast
 Phil Carey as Stephen Dorning
 Julia Arnall as Lisa Maitland
 Dermot Walsh as Henry Maitland
 Vera Day as Diane
 Peter Swanwick as Nicholas Steiner
 John Atkinson as Matt
 Betty Le Beau as Maria
 Tony Quinn as Porter
 Robert Sansom as Bank Manager
 Pippa Stanley as Mrs. Stanhope
 Richard Nellor as Sir Hubert
 Nicholas Tanner as Policeman

Critical reception
TV Guide wrote, "the movie is badly produced and too seamy for its own good." In The New York Times, Bosley Crowther wrote, "now that the British are importing American actors to commit homicide in their low-budget movies, they seem to have lost their flair."  Crowther called it a "foolish melodrama" that is "several kilometers removed from Agatha Christie."  Sky Movies called it a "creepy little thriller" that is "hugely enjoyable. The director doesn't miss a trick at tightening up the suspense."

External links

References

1961 films
1960s mystery films
British independent films
British mystery films
Columbia Pictures films
1960s English-language films
1960s British films